Eric Christopher Stanley Megaw MBE (1908 – 25 January 1956)  was an Irish (Belfast-educated) engineer who refined the power of the cavity magnetron for radar purposes (detection of U-boats) in the Second World War. He was appointed an MBE in 1943.

Early life
He was born in Dublin. Two of his younger brothers, Peter Megaw and Basil Megaw, attended the same grammar school as him in Belfast. He was the son of Arthur Stanley Megaw who married Helen Smith. He attended Campbell College and Queen's University Belfast.

He was an active radio amateur, and while still at school was the first amateur operator to manage contact between Ireland and Australia. After graduating from Queen's at the age of 20, he was awarded a research fellowship at Imperial College, London.

Career

Cavity magnetron

He was the leader of a group working on the cavity magnetron from April 1940 in north-west London. The cavity magnetron was producing power of around 500W (E1188 version). Eric Megaw changed the design, coating the cathode with oxides (E1189 version) and eight segments from six, to increase the power to 100 kW by September 1940, enough to detect submarines. The first trial on board an aircraft took place in March 1941.

The greatly-improved cavity magnetron would be valuable to the Tizard Mission.

Personal life
He was fluent in French, German and Italian. His name has sometimes been erroneously spelled Eric McGaw.

See also
 History of radar
 List of World War II British naval radar

References

 The Development of Radar Equipments for the Royal Navy, 1935–45, page 111, Naval Radar Trust 1995
 Technical and Military Imperatives: A Radar History of World War 2, page 153

External links
 Complete description of research
 History
 Radarpages
 Science Museum
 Cavity magnetron

1908 births
1956 deaths
Alumni of Queen's University Belfast
Battle of the Atlantic
20th-century Irish engineers
Members of the Order of the British Empire
People educated at Campbell College
Engineers from Dublin (city)
Radar pioneers